Playlist: The Very Best of Sara Evans is the second compilation album from Sara Evans, after 2007's Greatest Hits, released as part of the Legacy Recordings Playlist series. The album features a selection of Evans' biggest hits, as well as album tracks and songs that have not previously been included on any of her albums.

Track listing

Chart performance

References

Sara Evans albums
2013 greatest hits albums
Evans, Sara